Groove House is an album by pianist Ray Bryant released on Sue Records in 1963.

Reception 

The AllMusic review stated "Pianist Ray Bryant covers a lot of ground in the 30-odd minutes of this release from 1963. For much of the time, the versatile pianist – accompanied by a classic, supportive rhythm section – plays like a less intense version of piano giants such as Art Tatum, Bud Powell, and Oscar Peterson".

Track listing 
All compositions by Ray Bryant except where noted
 "Joey" (Herbert Wiener, Stanley Bernstein, James J. Kriegsmann, Bert Salmirs) – 3:30
 "Sweetest Sounds" (Richard Rodgers) – 4:04
 "Glissamba" – 4:00
 "My Reverie" (Larry Clinton) – 2:30
 "Long Way from Home" (Traditional) – 3:00
 "Backroom" – 4:40
 "Chariot Swing" (Traditional) – 3:00
 "No. Two" – 3:06
 "Gravy Waltz" (Ray Brown) – 3:10
 "Be-Bop Irishman" – 3:42
Recorded in New York City on May 22, 1963 (tracks 3, 5, 7 & 9), June 14, 1963 (tracks 2, 4 & 6) and June 19, 1963 (tracks 1, 8 & 10)

Personnel 
Ray Bryant – piano
Wally Richardson – guitar (tracks 3, 5, 7 & 9)
Tommy Bryant – bass 
Bobby Donaldson (tracks 1, 2, 4, 6, 8 & 10), Panama Francis  (tracks 3, 5, 7 & 9) – drums

References 

1963 albums
Ray Bryant albums
Sue Records albums